Spongiodermidae is a family of corals belonging to the order Alcyonacea.

Genera:
 Callipodium Verrill, 1869
 Diodogorgia Kükenthal, 1919
 Homophyton Gray, 1866
 Sclerophyton Cairns & Wirshing, 2015
 Titanideum Verrill, 1864
 Tripalea Bayer, 1955

References

 
Scleraxonia
Cnidarian families